Gumilevia zhiraph is a moth in the family Cossidae. It was described by Yakovlev in 2011. It is found in Uganda and the Democratic Republic of Congo.

References

Natural History Museum Lepidoptera generic names catalog

Cossinae
Moths described in 2011
Moths of Africa